Berbers in Mauritania are Mauritanian citizens of Berber descent or persons of Berber descent residing in Mauritania. Ethnic Berbers in Mauritania are believed to number of 2,883,000 (2,768,000 & 115,000)

See also 
Berbers in France

References 

 
Ethnic groups in Mauritania